Christian Albert, Margrave of Brandenburg-Ansbach (18 September 1675 – 16 October 1692) was a German prince.

Rule
He was the second son of John Frederick.  Since his older brother Leopold Frederick had died at the age of two, he succeeded his father as margrave of Brandenburg-Ansbach in 1686.  Since he was a minor at the time, a regent was appointed.  As he was still a minor when he died, he never actually ruled Brandenburg-Ansbach.  He was succeeded by his younger brother George Frederick.

Ancestry

References

1675 births
1692 deaths
House of Hohenzollern
Margraves of Brandenburg-Ansbach
17th-century German people